Meliponaspis is a genus of mites in the family Laelapidae.

Species
 Meliponaspis debilipes Vitzthum, 1930

References

Laelapidae